Gary Tauchen (born November 23, 1953) is an American dairy farmer and Republican politician.  He was a member of the Wisconsin State Assembly, representing the 6th Assembly district from 2007 through 2022.  The 6th district comprised most of Shawano County along with northwestern Outagamie County and neighboring towns in eastern Waupaca County.

Early life and career
Born in Rice Lake, Wisconsin, Tauchen graduated from Bonduel High School in 1971.  He briefly attended the University of Wisconsin–Madison and received his bachelor's degree in animal science from the University of Wisconsin–River Falls.  In 1976, in partnership with his father, Herb, and brother, Alan, Tauchen started Tauchen's Harmony Valley Farm, which he still co-owns and operates with his parents and his two surviving brothers.  Today, the farm has around 1200 milking cows and raises crops on nearly 2500 acres.  Through his farm business, Tauchen became involved in a number of farm and conservation councils in Wisconsin.  He was chairman of the Shawano Farm Bureau and the Wisconsin Dairy Herd Improvement Cooperative, and chaired Governor Tommy Thompson's Dairy 20/20 Council.

Political career
In April 2006, State Representative John Ainsworth announced he would not seek reelection to another term.  A few weeks later, in an event at his family farm, Tauchen announced he would be a candidate for Wisconsin State Assembly in the seat vacated by Ainsworth.  Ultimately, four other candidates also joined the Republican primary in the heavily Republican district, though one candidate, Paul Mogged, would drop out before the primary to endorse Tauchen.  Tauchen was also endorsed by the Wisconsin Farm Bureau—a lobbying organization for farming interests.  Tauchen prevailed in the primary, receiving a majority of the votes in the four-way contest.  In the general election, Tauchen defeated Democrat Richard Lieffring, a teacher from Cecil, Wisconsin, taking 60% of the vote.  Tauchen has subsequently been reelected seven times.

Tauchen currently serves as chairman of the Assembly Committee on Agriculture and also serves on the Assembly committees on Energy and Utilities, on State Affairs, and on Tourism.

On January 21, 2021, he announced that he would not seek re-election.

Electoral history

Wisconsin Assembly (2006–2020)

References

External links
 
 
 Campaign Website (Archived 11/2/2018)
 Representative Gary Tauchen at Wisconsin Legislature

1953 births
Living people
People from Rice Lake, Wisconsin
Republican Party members of the Wisconsin State Assembly
University of Wisconsin–River Falls alumni
21st-century American politicians